Peter Hugh Raspin (born 26 November 1951) is an English former first-class cricketer.

Raspin was born in November 1951 at Farnworth, Lancashire. He later studied at St Edmund Hall, Oxford. While studying at Oxford, he made three appearances in first-class cricket for Oxford University in 1973, against Surrey and Warwickshire. He scored 15 runs in his two matches, in addition to taking 3 wickets with his slow left-arm orthodox bowling.

References

External links

1951 births
Living people
People from Farnworth
Alumni of St Edmund Hall, Oxford
English cricketers
Oxford University cricketers